Griottines are cherries macerated in eau de vie or kirsch, common to Fougerolles (Haute-Saône) in Franche-Comté, eastern France. They can be eaten alone, or used in a number of local dishes both savoury and sweet.

See also
 List of cherry dishes

References

External links 
 Le site officiel des Griottines

Cuisine of Haute-Saône
Cherry dishes